Wye River is a small town in Victoria, Australia. It is also the name given to the waterway which flows through the town and into the sea at this point. Situated some 155 km west of Melbourne, on the Otway Coast part of the scenic Great Ocean Road, the Wye River township is a popular tourist destination about 15 km west of the resort town of Lorne, Victoria. It became a popular place for Melburnians to holiday after the Great Ocean Road was officially opened in 1932. The postcode of Wye River is 3234.

History
The site was occupied by white settlers in 1882. Brothers Alex and Donald MacRea and their cousin Alex MacLennan were looking for an area suited to farming and fishing and chose this site. The MacRaes settled near Separation Creek, establishing a farm which they named The Wye after a river in Wales and Herefordshire.  Alex MacLennan settled a little further west at a site he named The Kennet (later the town of Kennett River) after another UK river.

Wye River Post Office opened on 19 January 1914 though some time before 1945 it was reduced to a telegraph office for a considerable period of time, mail being delivered from Lorne. A school was established in the local hall in 1920, but closed in 1921 after the closure of a sawmill resulted in a loss of population. It was re-established in a converted residence in 1931, operated part-time with the Aireys Inlet school from 1935, and closed permanently in 1942.

On Christmas Day 2015 a bushfire destroyed at least 98 homes in Wye River. At nearby Separation Creek another 18 homes were destroyed. There were no deaths at either town.

Tourism
The area is known for scenic coastal views, beautiful beaches, Otway Forest walks, wildlife including koalas and birds as well as the Great Otway National Park. Active tourism opportunities include fishing and excellent surfing.

The official tourism organisation representing Wye River is Otway Coast Tourism.

There are many self-contained holiday rental houses available. Wye River is an all season tourist destination where visitors enjoy beaches in summer and drives, food trails and water falls in winter. Tourists travelling with dogs are encouraged in many places.

There are two caravan parks, the Seasonal Foreshore, located close to the main beach, and the BIG4 Wye River Holiday Parkin the valley, which is privately owned and operates all year round.

There is one pub, the Wye Beach Hotel (formally known as "The Rookery Nook Hotel") and a general store Wye General which also contains the post office and a cafe.

In recent years, the numbers of southern right whales and humpback whales seen around the shores are increasing as the whale populations recover as well as other species such as bottlenose dolphins.

Organisations

Wye River has a Country Fire Brigade and a Surf Life Saving Club.
A cycling group called the Wye Riders ride bikes in the morning on the Great Ocean Road. They can often be seen afterwards at the general store having breakfast.

The Wye River Separation Creek Progress Association whose purpose is simply to "advance the welfare and protect the environment" of  Wye River and Separation Creek.
The association's volunteer committee of 12 meets every few months and hosts a public forum in January that is open to the entire community and the many related service organisations.

Transport

Automobiles are the main form of transport to get to and from the town, via the Great Ocean Road. Within the town, most people walk between destinations. 
Wye River is serviced by the 101 V/Line coach that travels between Geelong Station and Apollo Bay in both directions.

Media

A few seconds of the 2013 movie Blinder was filmed in Wye River. The scene features a car driving along the Great Ocean Road. The camera was positioned outside the local pub.

Notable residents

 Steve Bracks, politician (former premier of Victoria)
 Mike Brady, musician

References

External links

Otway Coast Tourism information
Wye Falls
Colac Otway Shire
Colac Otway Web 
 Great Ocean Road 
Wye River
Wye River Surf Life Saving Club

Towns in Victoria (Australia)
Coastal towns in Victoria (Australia)
Otway Ranges